Gonçalo Uva (born 3 October 1984 in Lisbon) is a former Portuguese rugby union player. He played as a lock. 

He played for Montpellier Hérault RC and RC Narbonne, in French rugby, the Top 14. He played for Grupo Desportivo Direito, in Portugal, where he finished his career in 2017/18.

Uva had 101 caps for Portugal, from 2004 to 2018. He scored 9 tries, 45 points on aggregate. Uva is the brother of Vasco Uva, and cousin of João Uva, both rugby players. They all played at the 2007 Rugby World Cup. Gonçalo Uva played in all the four games at the competition, without scoring.

References

External links 
ERC profile
Gonçalo Uva on 2rugby
Gonçalo Uva at ESPN

1984 births
Living people
Portuguese rugby union players
Rugby union locks
Montpellier Hérault Rugby players
Rugby union players from Lisbon
Grupo Desportivo Direito players
Portugal international rugby union players